North Union High School may refer to:
North Union High School (Iowa), part of the North Union Community School District, Armstrong, Iowa, U.S.
North Union High School (Ohio), Richwood, Ohio, U.S.

See also
North Union (disambiguation)